Cinnamomum ovalifoilium, called wild cinnamon or wal kurundu in Sinhala, is an evergreen tree endemic to Sri Lanka. It is in brink of extinction  due to point distribution.

References
 https://web.archive.org/web/20140809192831/http://www.sljol.info/index.php/TAR/article/viewFile/3298/2675
 http://www.theplantlist.org/tpl/record/kew-2721494

External links
 http://lauraceae.myspecies.info/taxonomy/term/16431/maps
 https://www.gbif.org/species/108728734

ovalifolium
Endemic flora of Sri Lanka